Christian Lares (born ) is a former Argentine male volleyball player. He was part of the Argentina men's national volleyball team. He competed with the national team at the 2000 Summer Olympics in Sydney, Australia, finishing 4th.

See also
 Argentina at the 2000 Summer Olympics

References

External links
 profile at sports-reference.com

1974 births
Living people
Argentine men's volleyball players
Place of birth missing (living people)
Volleyball players at the 2000 Summer Olympics
Olympic volleyball players of Argentina
Pan American Games medalists in volleyball
Pan American Games bronze medalists for Argentina
Pan American Games gold medalists for Argentina
Medalists at the 1991 Pan American Games
Medalists at the 1995 Pan American Games